Argyrotaenia lojalojae is a species of moth of the family Tortricidae. It is found in Loja Province, Ecuador.

The wingspan is about 18 mm. The ground colour of the forewings is white, in the basal half of the wing mixed with grey and in the distal half with silver. The strigulation (fine streaks) and suffusions are grey. The hindwings  are whitish, strigulated with brownish grey in the distal half.

Etymology
The species name refers to the type locality and the name of the province.

References

Moths described in 2010
lojalojae
Moths of South America